Yanko Daucik Ciboch (22 March 1941 – 13 May 2017) was a Slovak professional footballer during the 1960s and 1970s. Yanko played for Real Betis, Real Madrid, the Toronto Falcons and RCD Español. Daucik is the son of Ferdinand Daučík, the veteran La Liga manager who moved with his family to Spain in 1950.

Daucik made his La Liga debut for Real Betis on 11 September 1960 in a game against RCD Mallorca.  His father was the Betis manager at the time. Yanko scored 14 goals in 38 La Liga appearances for Betis, attracting the interest of Real Madrid who signed him in 1962. However he faced stiff competition from the likes of Alfredo Di Stéfano, Francisco Gento, Ferenc Puskás and Amancio Amaro and during two seasons at Real he only played 10 La Liga games and scored just 3 goals. In the summer of 1966 he played in the Eastern Canada Professional Soccer League with Toronto Italia Falcons. He subsequently became one of the first Spanish footballers to play in North America when he played for Toronto Falcons of the National Professional Soccer League. This proved to something of a family reunion as Yanko was joined at the club by his father Ferdinand, brother-in-law Ladislao Kubala and nephew Branko Kubala. During the 1967 season Yanko played 17 games, scored 20 goals and made 8 assists for the Falcons and finished as the top scorer in the league.

Daucik died on 13 May 2017 in Madrid at the age of 76.

Sources
  La Liga site
 
 Real Madrid veterans
 nasljerseys.com

References

External links
   Toronto Falcons stats

1941 births
2017 deaths
Slovak footballers
Czechoslovak emigrants to Spain
Spanish footballers
UD Salamanca players
Real Betis players
Real Madrid CF players
Atlético Madrid footballers
UD Melilla footballers
RCD Mallorca players
Rayo Vallecano players
UE Sant Andreu footballers
RCD Espanyol footballers
Xerez CD footballers
La Liga players
National Professional Soccer League (1967) players
North American Soccer League (1968–1984) players
Toronto Falcons (1967–68) players
SD Indautxu footballers
Association football forwards
Toronto Italia players
Eastern Canada Professional Soccer League players